The Permanent Representative of Honduras to the United Nations  is the Chief of Mission of the delegation of Honduras, and highest permanent representative of the Government of Honduras to the United Nations.

The official duty of the Honduran Permanent Representative, currently Mary Elizabeth Flores Flake, is to represent the interests of Honduras during all plenary meetings of the General Assembly in the absence of a senior officer (such as the Minister of Foreign Relations (Honduras) or the President of Honduras). Flake is also the first woman to be appointed as the Permanent Representative of the Honduran Mission, before the United Nations.

Ms. Flores has served as Vice-President of the National Congress of Honduras since 2006 and presides over sessions over national issues. Ms. Flores is also a leading figure in her country’s politics, advocating causes ranging from constitutional reforms, health and environmental initiatives and energy conservation to issues of ethics, transparency and human rights.  She has spearheaded numerous social projects, including some directed towards the needy in the poverty-stricken areas of Honduras’ capital, Tegucigalpa, and invested in micro-financing programmes for women in small businesses.
She received her Bachelor of Arts degree in mass communication from the University of Loyola in New Orleans, in 1997.  She also obtained a law degree from Universidad Nacional Autónoma de Honduras in 2009.

Flake is also the daughter of former Honduran President Carlos Roberto Flores (1998–2002), and was born on December 6, 1973. She has two children.

The following is a chronological list of those who have held the office:

References

Permanent Representatives of Honduras to the United Nations
Honduras